Sleepless may refer to:

Film and television 
 Sleepless (1957 film), an Egyptian drama film by Salah Abu Seif
 La Anam (novel), a 1969 Arabic novel by Ihsan Abdel Quddous, which the film adapts
 Sleepless (2001 film), a horror film of 2001 by Dario Argento
 Sleepless (2017 film), a 2017 American crime-drama film
 "Sleepless" (The X-Files), a 1994 episode of the television show The X-Files

Literature 
 Sleepless (novel), a novel by Charlie Huston
 Sleepless (comics), a comic book by Sarah Vaughn and Leila del Duca
 The Sleepless trilogy of novels by Nancy Kress

Music 
 Sleepless (Kate Rusby album), 1999
 Sleepless (Jacksoul album), 2000
 Sleepless (Peter Wolf album), 2002
 Sleepless (Adept album), 2016
 Sleepless: The Concise King Crimson, an album by King Crimson
 "Sleepless" (King Crimson song), 1984
 "Sleepless" (Eric Saade song), 2009
 "Sleepless" (Flume song), 2011
 "Sleepless" (Cazzette song), 2014
 "Sleepless", a song by Despised Icon from Day of Mourning, 2009
 "Sleepless", a song by deadmau5 from Album Title Goes Here, 2012
 "Sleepless", a song by Northlane from Alien, 2019
 "Sleepless", a song by Anathema from Serenades, 1993
Covered by Cradle of Filth, 1999
 "Sleepless", a song by Soul Coughing from Irresistible Bliss, 1996
 "Sleepless", a song by Jann Arden from Blood Red Cherry, 2000

See also
 Insomnia, a sleeping disorder characterized by persistent difficulty falling or staying asleep